The Herald & Review is a daily newspaper based in Decatur, Illinois. It is owned by Lee Enterprises.

The Herald & Review was named one of Editor & Publisher's "10 Newspapers That Do It Right" in 2019 for its use of government documents and public records to create substantive journalism.

In 2018, the Herald & Review was recognized by Editor & Publisher for digital growth and other initiatives. It also received top honors in the investigative reporting and public service categories in the Illinois Associated Press Media Editors 2017 newspaper contest.

The Herald & Review in August 2017 was one of 10 newsrooms chosen from across the country to receive a grant for watchdog training through Investigative Reporters and Editors Inc., a nonprofit organization dedicated to strengthening investigative journalism.

The Herald & Review also founded the Herald and Review 100, an auto race held annually at Macon Speedway, in Macon, Illinois.

History

The Rev. Alfred F. Wuensch founded the Decatur Review as a weekly newspaper in April 1872. C.N. Walls founded the Daily Herald in 1878. In 1931, the morning Herald, by this time owned by the Lindsay family, and the evening Daily Review, owned by the Schaub family, merged their operations. Both newspapers continued to publish separately while maintaining largely separate editorial staffs. The Lindsay-Schaub combine acquired other newspapers, including The Southern Illinoisan, the Champaign-Urbana Courier, the Edwardsville Intelligencer, the Metro-East Journal and the Midland Daily News, as well as Decatur radio station WSOY.

On July 13, 1937, 17 of the paper's editorial employees walked out and went on strike, forcing suspension of the paper, Decatur's only daily newspaper at the time.

The newspaper moved into its current building in May 1976.

In 1979, Lee Enterprises purchased most of the Lindsay-Schaub papers, including the Herald and Daily Review. The papers were renamed the Herald & Review and continued to publish morning and evening editions. In June 1982, the evening edition was discontinued.

Chapter 11 bankruptcy, debt discharge and bailout reorganization (2011) 
The ownership company, Lee Enterprises filed for Chapter 11 bankruptcy in 2011. It emerged from bankruptcy less than two months later. In April 2012, Warren Buffett took a stake in Lee Enterprises (through Berkshire Hathaway Inc.), buying $85 million of the company's debt from Goldman Sachs Group.

In June 2012, Berkshire Hathaway filed an amended Form 13F (13F-HR/A) for the period ending March 31, 2012. This document disclosed that Berkshire accumulated $2,119,000 or 1,655,125 common shares of Lee Enterprises, or a 3.2 percent stake. The document noted that the confidentiality of this transaction was requested but denied by the SEC on May 25, 2012.

Debt recapitalization (2013-14) following bankruptcy and bailout 
In April 2013, Lee Enterprises announced that Berkshire Hathaway refinanced the remaining Pulitzer acquisition debt equating to $94 million.  Lee Enterprises incurred no cost for doing this. The collateral involved was the TNI Partner stake including the Arizona Daily Star and azstarnet.com. The result of this was a reduction in interest from a variable rate of 11.3% to a fixed rate of 9% while at the same time extending the debt maturity date of the debt from December 2015 to April 2017. At the time of the announcement Lee Enterprises noted they had $893 million left to pay off.  Lee paid off and retired its New Pulitzer notes in June 2015, 6 months before the original maturity date and 22 months before the new maturity date.  Lee also refinanced its remaining debt in 2014 in order to extend the maturities from 2015 and 2017 to 2019 and 2022. Lee retired its 1st Lien Term Loan in November 2018, four months before its scheduled March 2019 maturity.

On June 27, 2018, Lee Enterprises and Berkshire Hathaway reached a five-year agreement to allow Lee Enterprises to manage Berkshire Hathaway's newspaper and digital operations.

References

External links
 
 

1872 establishments in Illinois
Companies based in Macon County, Illinois
Daily newspapers published in the United States
Decatur, Illinois
Lee Enterprises publications
Newspapers published in Illinois
Publications established in 1872